Umargam INA is a town and an industrial notified area in Valsad district in the Indian state of Gujarat.

Demographics
 India census, Umargam INA had a population of 3520. Males constitute 58% of the population and females 42%. Umargam INA has an average literacy rate of 83%, higher than the national average of 59.5%: male literacy is 86%, and female literacy is 78%. In Umargam INA, 11% of the population is under 6 years of age.

References

Cities and towns in Valsad district